Hemigrammocharax is a genus of distichodontid fishes found in Africa, with these currently recognized species:
 Hemigrammocharax angolensis Poll, 1967
 Hemigrammocharax lineostriatus Poll, 1967
 Hemigrammocharax machadoi Poll, 1967 
 Hemigrammocharax minutus (Worthington, 1933)
 Hemigrammocharax monardi Pellegrin, 1936
 Hemigrammocharax multifasciatus (Boulenger, 1923) (Multibar citharine)
 Hemigrammocharax ocellicauda (Boulenger, 1907)
 Hemigrammocharax rubensteini Jerep & Vari, 2013
 Hemigrammocharax uniocellatus (Pellegrin, 1926)
 Hemigrammocharax wittei Poll, 1933

References

Distichodontidae
Fish of Africa
Taxa named by Jacques Pellegrin